Pedro Francisco de Lanini y Sagredo (c.1640 – c.1715) was a playwright of the Spanish Golden Age.

Lanini completed the play, Santa Rosa, which had been left unfinished by Agustín Moreto y Cavana at his death.

1640s births
1710s deaths
Spanish dramatists and playwrights
Spanish male dramatists and playwrights